Galen Michael Crew (born July 11, 1990) is an American singer-songwriter, musician, and music producer. In 2015, Crew's songs went viral in China, and has since reached hundreds of millions of streams on Chinese music platforms such as NetEase and Xiami. In response to the new following in China, Crew has toured the country multiple times, beginning in 2016. His music video for the single "Fragrance" was filmed in Shanghai, China and contains footage from other cities while on tour. The single "Princess" from his solo album Better than a Fairy Tale has been featured on the ABC show Good Morning America. In 2020, Crew made a guest appearance in the music video for the Newsboys single "Love One Another." Crew's eighth studio EP, Tunnels, was released March 30, 2021.

Early life 
Crew's high school band was Seraph, which was composed of Crew on electric guitar, Josh Caste as lead vocals, Nicky Hackett on bass, and Jordan Thompson on drums. He was also part of the rock-pop group Vinyl Relay while attending college. Crew became a solo artist in 2011 and began writing songs with Roger Cook in the same year.

Touring 
In 2013, Crew toured with Roger Cook in the United Kingdom. In 2014, Crew toured with Phil Joel across the United States. As of 2021, Crew's total streaming song listens have reached the hundreds of millions on Chinese sites, such as NetEase Cloud Music.

Crew was sponsored by the Chinese company XiaoKang and toured the China for the first time in May 2016. Crew has toured in Shanghai, Guangzhou, Beijing, and Hong Kong. Crew returned to China for a second tour in the fall of 2016, touring in 13 cities, including Zibo. In 2019, Crew completed a third tour of China in November and December, hosting concerts in seven cities, including Guangzhou, Hangzhou, Chongqing, and Chengdu.

Music & Influences 
Crew's style is described as "a blend of pop and alternative with some electronic and folky elements." Crew's musical influences include "the Beatles, Coldplay and John Mayer," and songwriting inspiration has been taken from mythical works and well-known fantasy authors such as J.R.R. Tolkien, C.S. Lewis, and Hermann Hesse. As a tribute to his success in China, Crew prominently featured the erhu, a traditional Chinese stringed instrument, in the single "Fragrance." The music video for the single also contains shots of Shanghai, Chinese scenery, and everyday life in China.

Discography 
Crew has released eight EPs and three LPs:
 Better Than a Fairy Tale (2012)
 Acoustic Daydreams (2012)
 Like Fire EP (2013)
 Christmas Spirit EP (2013)
 Let Them Sing (2014)
 Sleepyhead EP (2016)
Apologue, Vol. 1 EP (2018)
Apologue, Vol. 2 EP (2018)
Apologue, Vol. 3 EP (2018)
Apologue, Vol. 4 EP (2019)
Tunnels, EP (2021)

References

External links 
 
 
Spotify

1990 births
Living people